The 2022–23 Louisiana Tech Bulldogs basketball team represented Louisiana Tech University during the 2022–23 NCAA Division I men's basketball season. The team was led by first-year head coach Talvin Hester, and played their home games at Thomas Assembly Center in Ruston, Louisiana as a members of Conference USA.

Previous season
The Bulldogs finished the 2021–22 season 24–10, 12–6 in C-USA play to finish third place in the West Division. They defeated Marshall, Western Kentucky, North Texas to advance to the championship game of the C-USA tournament where they lost to UAB. Despite having 24 wins, they were not invited to a postseason tournament.

On March 22, 2022, head coach Eric Konkol left the school to accept the head coaching position at Tulsa. A week later, the school named Texas Tech assistant coach Talvin Hester the team's new head coach.

Offseason

Departures

Incoming transfers

2022 recruiting class

Roster

Schedule and results

|-
!colspan=9 style=| Regular season

|-
!colspan=9 style=| Conference USA tournament

Source

See also
 2022-23 Louisiana Tech Lady Techsters basketball team

References

Louisiana Tech Bulldogs basketball seasons
Louisiana Tech
Louisiana Tech basketball
Louisiana Tech basketball